Sophia (born ) is the pseudonym of a 51-year old Canadian woman who took her own life in 2022 after failing to find suitable housing for her medical needs. She is understood to be the first person in the world who used medical assistance in dying (MAID) in response to multiple chemical sensitivity.

Sophia 
Sophia was a 51-year old Canadian woman who had multiple chemical sensitivities, meaning she was allergic to chemical cleaners and cigarette smoke. She lived at the Salvation Army's Grace Communities residential apartments in Toronto and obtained care from Women’s College Hospital in Toronto. With support from friends, Sophia spent two years trying to find affordable housing that did not expose her to cigarette smoke and the scent of chemical cleaners. Her search was not successful, despite her pleas to the Government of Canada, the Government of Ontario, and local government. Sophia spent increased amount of time at home due to the public health measures implemented in response to the COVID-19 pandemic. No government agency in Canada has the responsibility to help people with environmental sensitivities find accommodation.

Sophia avoided media attention prior to her death, concerned that it would thwart her ability to take her own life. On February 14, Sophia recorded a video, later shared to CTV News in which she said: "The government sees me as expendable trash, a complainer, useless and a pain in the ass". To protect the privacy of her family, she asked her friends to share the video but to use the pseudonym of Sophia.

Death and aftermath 
Sophia died on February 22 2022, making use of new legal rights that existed in Canada since March 17, 2021.

Rohini Peris, President of the Environmental Health Association of Québec said, after her death: "This person begged for help for years, two years, wrote everywhere, called everywhere, asking for healthy housing."

University of Toronto PhD candidate Sophia Jaworski wrote in the American Ethnologist journal that "it is easier to access physician-assisted suicide than it is to secure accessible housing."

See also 

 Euthanasia in Canada

References 

2022 suicides
Deaths by person in Canada
Deaths by euthanasia
Suicides in Canada
Female suicides
Assisted suicide